Viva Blue, also known as the Finch/Richmond Hill/Newmarket line or the Yonge St. Corridor Line, is a line on the Viva bus rapid transit system in York Region, north of Toronto, Ontario, Canada. It is operated by Tok Transit, under contract from York Region Transit. This is the busiest bus route in the York Region Transit network.

List of stations
There are 27 stations on the Viva Blue line. From north to south they are:

History
Service from Finch station to Bernard began on September 4, 2005. Service north of Bernard to Newmarket Terminal began November 20, 2005.

There is also a Viva Blue Short Turn route operating from Finch station to Bernard. According to the original environmental assessments, it is also known as the Finch–Richmond Hill line.

Future

In the future, Viva Blue will have its own dedicated rapidway for most of the route between Newmarket Bus Terminal and Richmond Hill Centre Terminal. The first phase of the Yonge Street Rapidway opened in January 2020 and the second phase in December 2020. There are also plans to extend the bus route north to East Gwillimbury GO Station along Yonge Street and Green Lane. Eventually, the entire portion of rapidway could also be upgraded to allow light rail transit on this corridor.

Originally, the southern portion of the Yonge Street rapidway was to be implemented from 19th Avenue to Finch station, but since the announcement of MoveOntario 2020 by the Ontario provincial government, proposals of the portion of rapidway from Richmond Hill Centre to Finch station have been shelved for the proposed north extension of Line 1 Yonge–University.

While ridership on the Richmond Hill portion of Viva Blue is high for a suburban transit system, capacity constraints on the existing subway system prevent the Yonge Subway line from being extended into York Region. Alternatively (or concurrently), GO Transit plans to run express trains between Union Station in downtown Toronto, and its Langstaff train station adjacent to YRT's Richmond Hill Centre terminal daily.

See also
Viva Rapid Transit
Yonge Street

References

Blue